Duck Creek Park,  or variants thereof, can refer to:

Duck Creek Park and Golf Course, Davenport, Iowa
Duck Creek Parkway, Bettendorf and Davenport, Iowa